Rosanna Scalfi Marcello (1704 or 1705 – after 1742) was an Italian singer and composer.

Life
Rosanna Scalfi was a gondola singer of Venetian arie di battello, and was taken as a singing student by Italian nobleman, magistrate, writer, and composer Benedetto Marcello about 1723. The two were secretly wed in a religious ceremony on 20 May 1728, when she was twenty-four years old. However, this marriage to a commoner was unlawful and they never completed the civil requirements. After Marcello died of tuberculosis in 1739, the marriage was declared null by the state, and Rosanna was unable to inherit his estate. Left destitute, she filed suit in 1742 against Benedetto's brother Alessandro Marcello, seeking financial support, but her claims were rejected. She appeared as Arbace in Giuseppe Antonio Paganelli's Artaserse at St. Salvatore during the Ascension season that same year.

She composed twelve cantatas for alto and basso continuo, writing most if not all of the texts, as well. The manuscript volume, Twelve Cantatas for Alto Voice and Basso Continuo (ca. 1730), has been published in modern edition by Deborah Hayes and John Glenn Paton (Fayetteville, AR: ClarNan Editions, 2012). The editors' preface includes a biography of the composer, notes on the cantata lyrics and music, and guidelines for performance. The edition also contains continuo realizations, poetic rendering of the lyrics in Italian, and English translation.

List of cantatas 
I. 
II. 
III. 
IV. 
V. 
VI. 
VII. 
VIII. 
IX. 
X. 
XI. 
XII. 

Rosanna Marcello appears as a character in Joachim Raff's 1878 opera Benedetto Marcello, sung by mezzo-soprano.

References

Italian Baroque composers
Italian women classical composers
18th-century Italian women opera singers
1700s births
18th-century deaths
18th-century Italian composers
18th-century women composers